St Mary's Church, Norton, is an ancient parish church located on the village green of Norton, County Durham. It is the only cruciform Anglo-Saxon church in northern England and a Grade I listed building.

Description 
Its crossing tower with eight triangular head windows has a battlemented top of later date, and there is a 14th-century effigy of a knight in chainmail. Residing under the church floor there is claimed to be an escape tunnel used by the Saxons and priests when in danger, though it is more probably a drainage culvert. The tunnel leads under the church floor and Norton Green, eventually surfacing in the Albany housing estate. The church floor was recently renovated and Saxon remains and artefacts were discovered in the tunnel entrance.

Churchyard 
The grave of John Walker, the inventor of friction matches, is located in the churchyard.

References 

Grade I listed churches in County Durham
Church of England church buildings in County Durham
Buildings and structures in Stockton-on-Tees
Buildings and structures completed in 1020